The Test of Metal is a 67-kilometre cross-country mountain bike race that was held annually in and around Squamish, British Columbia until the final race in 2016. 

The demanding course, with over 1,200 metres of climbing and 35 kilometres of singletrack, takes just under three hours for the fastest riders and between four and five hours for the majority of competitors.  The number of entries allowed is limited (in 2006 to 800).  The race is part of the Test of Metal Mountain Bike Festival, a weekend of mountain biking, trials, and related events.

External links 
Official Website of the Test of Metal
MySquamish.com
SquamishMountainBike.com

Cycle races in Canada
Mountain biking events in Canada
Recurring sporting events established in 1995
1995 establishments in British Columbia
Mountain biking in British Columbia
Squamish, British Columbia